Mickey's Fire Brigade is a 1935 American animated short film produced by Walt Disney Productions and released by United Artists. The cartoon stars Mickey Mouse, Donald Duck, and Goofy employed as firefighters responding to a hotel fire. It was directed by Ben Sharpsteen and features the voices of Walt Disney as Mickey, Clarence Nash as Donald, Pinto Colvig as Goofy, and Elvia Allman as Clarabelle Cow. It was the 77th Mickey Mouse short to be released, and the sixth of that year.

Plot
Mickey Mouse, Donald Duck, and Goofy are firefighters responding to a hotel fire. Mickey drives a contemporary style hook-and-ladder fire truck, Donald is standing on the stack of ladders on the truck shouting "Fire! Fire! Fire!", while Goofy is steering the rear of the truck.

The three fire fighters arrive at the hotel and go to work. The film is filled with gags which show the trio how to be inept firemen, and the fire and smoke to have a mind of its own.

Finally Mickey realizes that there is a woman upstairs who needs saving. They find Clarabelle Cow locked in the bathroom taking a bath and singing to herself, unaware that the hotel is on fire. After Goofy unsuccessfully warns her through the transom, Mickey and Donald break the door down using Goofy as a battering ram. Clarabelle is alarmed and thinks that Mickey, Donald, and Goofy are kidnappers. As Clarabelle is screaming for the police and hitting them with her scrub brush, the three firefighters lift her bathtub, with Clarabelle still in it, and shove it out the window.

Clarabelle sails through the air in her tub, and slides down a ladder to the ground. The three firefighters then land in the bathtub. The film ends with Clarabelle continuously hitting them with her brush.

Voice cast
 Mickey Mouse: Walt Disney
 Donald Duck: Clarence Nash
 Goofy: Pinto Colvig
 Clarabelle Cow: Elvia Allman

Releases
1935 – Original theatrical release
1943 – The Fireman (8mm)
1998 – Ink & Paint Club, episode #1.59 "Clarabelle and Horace" (TV)

Home media
The short was released on December 4, 2001 on Walt Disney Treasures: Mickey Mouse in Living Color.

Additional releases include:
1984 – "Mickey's Crazy Careers" (VHS)
1992 – "Fun on the Job" (VHS)

See also 
 Mickey Mouse (film series)
 Mickey & Donald, a 1982 Game & Watch game with Mickey, Donald and Goofy as firefighters

References

External links

Mickey's Fire Brigade at The Encyclopedia of Animated Disney Shorts
Mickey's Fire Brigade at the Disney Film Project

1935 animated films
1935 films
1930s color films
Mickey Mouse short films
1930s Disney animated short films
Films about firefighting
Films directed by Ben Sharpsteen
Films produced by Walt Disney
1930s American films